His Faith in Humanity is a 1914 American silent short film directed by Sydney Ayres, starring  William Garwood, Louise Lester and Vivian Rich.

Cast
 William Garwood as Jim Marsh
 Louise Lester as His wife
 Vivian Rich as Mrs. Van Zandt
 Harry von Meter as Robert Sands
 Reaves Eason

External links

1914 films
1914 drama films
Silent American drama films
American silent short films
American black-and-white films
1914 short films
Films directed by Sydney Ayres
1910s American films
1910s English-language films